T-Hub (Technology Hub) is an innovation intermediary and business incubator based in Raidurg, Hyderabad, Telangana, India. Based on the triple helix model of innovation, it is a partnership between the Government of Telangana, three academic institutes in Hyderabad (the International Institute of Information Technology, the Indian School of Business and the National Academy of Legal Studies and Research) and the private sector. 

T-Hub provides Indian and international startups access to technology, talent, mentors, customers, corporates, investors, and government agencies. T-Hub also helps state and central government organizations build innovation ecosystems.

History

The first phase of T-Hub was formally launched by S. L. Narasimhan, Governor of Telangana; Ratan Tata, Chairman Emeritus of Tata Sons; and K. T. Rama Rao, Telangana IT & Panchayat Raj Minister on 5 November 2015.  

This first-of-a-kind initiative was anchored and driven by Srinivas Kollipara and Jay Krishnan as COO and CEO respectively, over the first few years, to help establish it within the Indian Startup and Innovation Ecosystem and achieve global visibility.  

In January 2019, Ravi Narayan was appointed CEO, his tenure running till June 2021. 

The second phase was to have been launched in 2018, but the opening was postponed; in September 2020, K. T. Rama Rao stated that the new facilities will be opened by the end of 2020. T-Hub 2.0 was inaugurated on 28 June, 2022, by Telangana Chief Minister K Chandrashekhar Rao. The facility will support over 2,000 startups under one roof, with a total built-up area of 5,82,689 square feet, making it the world’s largest innovation campus.

T-Hub runs various Startup incubator programs and it's flagship starup-incubator program is called Lab32 In March 2023, T-Hub joined hands with US-based Redberri to set up its global outpost in North America.

Board of Directors
 Jayesh Ranjan (Secretary, I. T. E. & C. Department, Telangana)
 P. J. Narayanan (Director, IIIT Hyderabad)
 Madan Mohan Pillutla
 Faizan Mustafa
 Sashi Reddi
 Raman Kumar
 Srinivasa Raju Chintalapati
 B. V. R. Mohan Reddy

WE Hub and Y-Hub
On the lines of T-Hub, Government of Telangana launched other incubators like WE Hub and Y-Hub. WE Hub is  India’s First State Led-Incubator for Woman Entrepreneurs while Y-Hub is exclusively for children and youth.

See also
List of business incubators
T-Works
IMAGE Tower
Salarpuria Sattva Knowledge City

References 

Economy of Telangana
Economy of Hyderabad, India
Organisations based in Hyderabad, India
Business incubators of India
KCR Government initiatives
2015 establishments in Telangana